A cherry blossom, also known as Japanese cherry or sakura, is a flower of many trees of genus Prunus or Prunus subg. Cerasus. They are common species in East Asia, including China, Korea and especially in Japan. They generally refer to ornamental cherry trees, not to be confused with cherry trees that produce fruit for eating. It is considered the national flower of Japan.

Wild species of the cherry tree is widely distributed mainly in the Northern hemisphere. In the mainstream classification in Europe and North America, cherry trees for ornamental purposes are classified into the genus Prunus which consists of about 400 species. In the mainstream classification in Japan, China, and Russia, on the other hand, ornamental cherry trees are classified into the genus Cerasus, which consists of about 100 species separated from the genus Prunus, and the genus Cerasus does not include Prunus salicina, Prunus persica (Peach), Prunus mume, Prunus grayana, amongst others. In Europe and North America, however, there were not many wild cherry trees with many large flowers suitable for cherry blossom viewing. Many of them were different from the typical cherry tree shapes and flowers for cherry blossom viewing that people today imagine. In mainland China, there has been a culture of viewing plum blossoms since ancient times, and there were many wild species of cherry blossoms, but many of them had small flowers, and the distribution area of wild species of cherry blossoms, which bore large flowers suitable for hanami, was often limited to a small area away from people's living areas. On the other hand, in Japan, Prunus speciosa (Oshima cherry) and Prunus jamasakura (Yamazakura), which bloom large flowers suitable for cherry blossom viewing and tend to become large trees, were distributed in a fairly wide area of the country and close to people's living areas. Therefore, it is considered that the culture of viewing cherry blossoms and the production of cultivars have developed historically in Japan.

Many of the cherry trees currently enjoyed for cherry blossom viewing are not wild species but cultivar. Because cherry trees have a mutable trait, many cultivars have been created for cherry blossom viewing, especially in Japan. Since the Heian period, the Japanese have produced many cultivars by selecting superior or mutant individuals that were born from natural crossings of wild cherry trees, or by crossing them artificially, and then breeding them by grafting and cutting. Oshima cherry, Yamazakura, Prunus pendula f.ascendens (syn, Prunus itosakura, Edo higan), and so on, which grow naturally in Japan, are easy to mutate, and especially Oshima cherry, which is an endemic species in Japan, tend to mutate into double-flowered, grow fast, have many large flowers, and have a strong fragrance; therefore, Oshima cherry has produced much sakura called Sato-zakura Group as a base of cultivars because of its favorable characteristics. The representative cultivars whose parent species is the Oshima cherry are Yoshino cherry and Kanzan; Yoshino cherries are actively planted in Asian countries, and Kanzan is actively planted in Western countries.

In Europe, from the late 19th century to the early 20th century, Collingwood Ingram, an Englishman, collected and studied Japanese cherry blossoms, and created various ornamental cultivars, and the culture of cherry blossom viewing began to be spread. In the United States, cherry blossom viewing began to spread after Japan presented cherry blossoms as a token of friendship in 1912. Cherry blossoms have been described to have a beautiful smell and have been the inspiration for many candles and inscents for the common households

Cherry blossoms are a major tourist attraction in Japan because of their mystical pink flowers.

Classification 
The botanical classification of cherry blossoms varies from period to period and from country to country. As of the 21st century, in the mainstream classification in Europe and North America, cherry trees for ornamental purposes are classified into the genus Prunus which consists of about 400 species. In the mainstream classification in Japan, China, and Russia, on the other hand, ornamental cherry trees are classified into the genus Cerasus, which consists of about 100 species separated from the genus Prunus, and the genus Cerasus does not include Prunus salicina, Prunus persica (Peach), Prunus mume, Prunus grayana, etc. In Japan, the genus Prunus was the mainstream as in Europe and America until around 1992, but it was reclassified into the genus Cerasus to more accurately reflect the latest botanical situation of cherry blossoms. However, it is often classified into the genus Prunus for presentation in English-speaking countries.

In addition, since cherry trees are relatively prone to mutation and have a variety of flowers and trees, there are many varieties, such as variety which is a sub-classification of species, hybrids between species, and cultivar. For this reason, many researchers have named different scientific names for a particular type of cherry tree in different periods, and there is confusion in the classification of cherry trees.

Time the Flowers Bloom  

Many wild species and cultivars bloom from March to April in the Northern Hemisphere. Wild species, even if they are the same species, are genetically different from one tree to another, so even if they are planted in the same place, there is some variation in the time when they reach full bloom. On the other hand, cultivars are clones propagated by grafting or cutting, so each tree of the same cultivar planted in the same place is in full bloom and scattered all at once.

Some wild species such as Edo higan and the cultivars developed from them are in full bloom before the leaves open, giving a showy impression to the people who enjoy them. Yoshino cherry became popular as a cherry tree for cherry-blossom viewing because, in addition to these characteristics of simultaneous flowering and the fact that the flowers are in full bloom before the leaves open, it bears a large number of flowers and grows quickly to become a big tree. Many cultivars of the Sato-zakura group, which were born from complex interspecific hybrids based on Oshima cherry, are often used for ornamental purposes and generally reach full bloom a few days after to two weeks after Yoshino cherry reaches full bloom.

The flowering time of cherry trees is thought to be affected by global warming and the heat island effect of urbanization. According to the record of full bloom dates of Yamazakura (Prunus jamasakura) in Kyoto, Japan, which was recorded for about 1200 years, the time of full bloom was relatively stable from 812 to 1800s, but after that, the time of full bloom rapidly became earlier and in 2021, the earliest full bloom date in 1200 years was recorded. According to the record of full bloom dates of Yoshino cherry in the Tidal Basin in Washington, D.C., around 1921 it was April 5, but around 2021 it was March 31. These records are consistent with the record of rapid increases in global mean temperature since the mid-1800s.

Flower viewing in Japan 

From then on, in both  and haiku,  meant "cherry blossoms". The custom was originally limited to the elite of the Imperial Court, but soon spread to samurai society and, by the Edo period, to the common people as well. Tokugawa Yoshimune planted areas of cherry blossom trees to encourage this. Under the  trees, people had lunch and drank  in cheerful feasts.

Since a book written in the Heian period mentions , one of the cultivars with pendulous branches, it is considered that Prunus itosakura 'Pendula' (Sidare-zakura) is the oldest cultivar in Japan. In the Kamakura period, when the population increased in the southern Kanto region, the Oshima cherry, which originated in Izu Oshima Island, was brought to Honshu and cultivated there, and then brought to the capital, Kyoto. In the Muromachi period, the Sato-zakura Group which was born from complex interspecific hybrids based on Oshima cherry, began to appear.

Prunus itosakura (syn. Prunus subhirtella, Edo higan), a wild species, grows slowly, but has the longest life span among cherry trees and is easy to grow into large trees. For this reason, there are many large and long-lived trees of this species in Japan, and their cherry trees are often regarded as sacred and have become a landmark that symbolizes Shinto shrines, Buddhist temples, and local areas. For example, Jindai-zakura that is around 2,000 years old, Usuzumi-zakura that is around 1,500 years old, and Daigo-zakura that is around 1,000 years old are famous.

In the Edo period, various double-flowered cultivars were produced and planted on the banks of rivers, in Buddhist temples, in Shinto shrines, and in daimyo gardens in urban areas such as Edo, and the common people living in urban areas could enjoy them. Books from that period recorded more than 200 varieties of cherry blossoms and mentioned many varieties of cherry blossoms which are currently known, such as 'Kanzan'. However, the situation was limited to urban areas, and the main objects of hanami across the country were wild species such as Prunus jamasakura (Yamazakura) and Oshima cherry, which were widely distributed in the country.

Since the Meiji period when Japan was modernized, Yoshino cherry has spread throughout Japan, and the object of hanami for Japanese people has changed to Yoshino cherry. On the other hand, various cultivars other than Yoshino cherry were cut down one after another due to the rapid modernization of cities, such as reclamation of waterways and demolition of daimyo gardens. The gardener Takagi Magoemon and the village mayor of Kohoku Village Shimizu Kengo worried about this situation and saved them from the danger of extinction by making a row of cherry trees composed of various cultivars on the Arakawa River bank. In Kyoto, Sano Toemon XIV, a gardener, collected various cultivars and propagated them. After World War II, these cultivars were inherited by the National Institute of Genetics, Tama Forest Science Garden, and the Flower Association of Japan, and from the 1960s onwards various cultivars were again used for hanami.

The blossoming begins in Okinawa in January, and typically reaches Kyoto and Tokyo at the end of March or the beginning of April. It proceeds into areas at the higher altitudes and northward, arriving in Hokkaido a few weeks later. Japanese pay close attention to these forecasts and turn out in large numbers at parks, shrines, and temples with family and friends to hold flower-viewing parties.  festivals celebrate the beauty of the cherry blossom and for many are a chance to relax and enjoy the beautiful view. The custom of  dates back many centuries in Japan. The 8th century chronicle  records  festivals being held as early as the 3rd century AD.

Most Japanese schools and public buildings have cherry blossom trees outside of them. Since the fiscal and school year both begin in April, in many parts of Honshu, the first day of work or school coincides with the cherry blossom season. However, while most cherry blossom trees bloom in spring, there are also lesser known winter cherry blossoms (fuyuzakura in Japanese) that bloom between October and December. This allows for people to see both cherry blossoms and fall leaves in bloom at the same time.

The Japan Cherry Blossom Association developed a list of Japan's Top 100 Cherry Blossom Spots with at least one location in every prefecture.

Symbolism in Japan 

In Japan, cherry blossoms symbolize clouds due to their nature of blooming , besides being an enduring metaphor for the ephemeral nature of life, an aspect of Japanese cultural tradition that is often associated with Shinto influence, and which is embodied in the concept of mono no aware. The association of the cherry blossom with mono no aware dates back to 18th-century scholar Motoori Norinaga. The transience of the blossoms, the exquisite beauty, and volatility, has often been associated with mortality and graceful and readily acceptance of destiny and karma; for this reason, cherry blossoms are richly symbolic and have been utilized often in Japanese art, manga, anime, and film, as well as at musical performances for ambient effect. There is at least one popular folk song, originally meant for the shakuhachi (bamboo flute), titled "Sakura", and several pop songs. The flower is also represented in all manner of consumer goods in Japan, including kimono, stationery, and dishware.

The Sakurakai or Cherry Blossom Society was the name chosen by young officers within the Imperial Japanese Army in September 1930 for their secret society established to reorganize the state along totalitarian militaristic lines, via a military coup d'état if necessary.

During World War II, the cherry blossom was used to motivate the Japanese people, to stoke nationalism and militarism among the populace. Even before the war, they were used in propaganda to inspire the "Japanese spirit", as in the "Song of Young Japan", exulting in "warriors" who were "ready like the myriad cherry blossoms to scatter". In 1932, Akiko Yosano's poetry urged Japanese soldiers to endure sufferings in China and compared the dead soldiers to cherry blossoms. Arguments that the plans for the Battle of Leyte Gulf, involving all Japanese ships, would expose Japan to danger if they failed, were countered with the plea that the Navy be permitted to "bloom as flowers of death". The last message of the forces on Peleliu was "Sakura, Sakura" — cherry blossoms. Japanese pilots would paint them on the sides of their planes before embarking on a suicide mission, or even take branches of the trees with them on their missions. A cherry blossom painted on the side of the bomber symbolized the intensity and ephemerality of life; in this way, the aesthetic association was altered such that falling cherry petals came to represent the sacrifice of youth in suicide missions to honor the emperor. The first kamikaze unit had a subunit called Yamazakura or wild cherry blossom. The government even encouraged the people to believe that the souls of downed warriors were reincarnated in the blossoms.

Cherry blossoms are a prevalent symbol in Irezumi, the traditional art of Japanese tattoos. In tattoo art, cherry blossoms are often combined with other classic Japanese symbols like koi fish, dragons or tigers.

It was later used for the Tokyo 2020 Paralympics mascot Someity. It is also a common 'season' that signals the start of spring in the Animal Crossing series of video games, where all of the game's leafy trees bloom with cherry blossoms.

Cultivars 

Japan has a wide variety of cherry blossoms (sakura); well over 200 cultivars can be found there. According to another classification method, it is thought that there are more than 600 cultivars in Japan. According to the Tokyo Shimbun, there are 800 varieties of cherry blossoms in Japan. According to the results of DNA analysis of 215 cultivars carried out by Japan's Forestry and Forest Products Research Institute in 2014, many of the cultivars of cherry trees that have spread around the world are interspecific hybrids that were produced by crossing Oshima cherry and Prunusu jamasakura (Yamazakura) with various wild species. Among these cultivars, the Sato-zakura Group, and many cultivars have a large number of petals, and the representative cultivar is Prunus serrulata 'Kanzan'.

The following species, hybrids, and varieties are used for sakura cultivars:
 Prunus apetala
 Prunus campanulata
 Prunus × furuseana (P. incisa × P. jamasakura)
 Prunus × incam (P. incisa × P. campanulata)
 Prunus incisa var. incisa
 Prunus incisa var. kinkiensis
 Prunus × introrsa
 Prunus itosakura (Prunus subhirtella, Prunus pendula)
 Prunus jamasakura
 Prunus × kanzakura (P. campanulata × P. jamasakura and P. campanulata × P. speciosa)
 Prunus leveilleana (Prunus verecunda)
 Prunus × miyoshii
 Prunus nipponica
 Prunus padus
 Prunus × parvifolia (P. incisa × P. speciosa)
 Prunus pseudocerasus
 Prunus × sacra (P. itosakura × P. jamasakura)
 Prunus sargentii
 Prunus serrulata var. lannesiana, Prunus lannesiana (Prunus Sato-zakura group. Complex interspecific hybrids based on Prunus speciosa.)
 Prunus × sieboldii
 Prunus speciosa
 Prunus × subhirtella (P. incisa × P. itosakura)
 Prunus × syodoi
 Prunus × tajimensis
 Prunus × takenakae
 Prunus × yedoensis (P. itosakura × P. speciosa)

The most popular variety of cherry blossoms in Japan is the Somei Yoshino (Yoshino cherry). Its flowers are nearly pure white, tinged with the palest pink, especially near the stem. They bloom and usually fall within a week before the leaves come out. Therefore, the trees look nearly white from top to bottom. The variety takes its name from the village of Somei (now part of Toshima in Tokyo). It was developed in the mid to late-19th century at the end of the Edo period and the beginning of the Meiji period. The Somei Yoshino is so widely associated with cherry blossoms that jidaigeki and other works of fiction often depict the variety in the Edo period or earlier; such depictions are anachronisms.

Prunus × kanzakura 'Kawazu-zakura' is a representative cultivar that blooms before the arrival of spring. It is a natural hybrid between Oshima cherry and Prunus campanulata, and is characterized by deep pink petals. Wild cherry trees usually do not bloom in cold seasons because they cannot produce offspring if they bloom before spring when the pollinating insects begin to move. However, it is considered that 'Kawazu-zakura' bloomed earlier because Prunus campanulata from Okinawa, which did not originally grow naturally in Honshu, crossed with Oshima cherry. In wild species, flowering before spring is a disadvantageous feature of selection, but in cultivars such as 'Kawazu-zakura', early flowering and flower characteristics are preferred and they are propagated by grafting.

Cherry blossoms are basically classified by species and cultivars, but in Japan they are often classified by specific names based on the characteristics of the flowers and trees. Cherry trees with more petals than ordinary cherry trees with five petals are classified as yae-zakura (double-flowered sakura), and those with drooping branches are classified as shidare-zakura, or weeping cherry. Most yae-zakura and shidare-zakura are cultivars. Famous cultivars of shidare-zakura are 'Shidare-zakura', 'Beni-shidare' and 'Yae-beni-shidare', all derived from the wild species Prunus itosakura (syn, Prunus subhirtella or Edo higan).

The color of cherry blossoms in general has a gradation between white and red, but there are cultivars with unusual colors such as yellow and green. The representative cultivars are Prunus serrulata 'Grandiflora' A. Wagner (Ukon) and Prunus serrulata 'Gioiko' Koidz (Gyoiko) developed in the Edo period of Japan.

In 2007, Riken produced a new cultivar named 'Nishina zao' by irradiating cherry trees with a heavy-ion beam for the first time in the world. This cultivar is produced from the Prunus serrulata 'Gioiko' (Gyoiko) with green petals, and is characterized by its pale yellow-green-white flowers when it blooms and pale yellow-pink flowers when they fall. Riken produced 'Nishina otome', 'Nishina haruka', and 'Nishina komachi' in the same way.

All wild varieties of cherry blossom trees produce small, unpalatable fruit or edible cherries. Edible cherries generally come from cultivars of the related species Prunus avium and Prunus cerasus. However, in some cultivars, the pistil changes like a leaf and loses its fertility, and for example, Prunus serrulata 'Hisakura' (Ichiyo) and Prunus serrulata 'Albo-rosea' Makino (Fugenzo), which originated from Oshima cherry, can only be propagated by artificial methods such as grafting and cutting.

By country and region

Australia 

During World War II, a prisoner of war (POW) camp near the town of Cowra in New South Wales, Australia, was the site of one of the largest prison escapes of the war, on 5 August 1944. During the Cowra breakout and subsequent rounding up of POWs, four Australian soldiers and 231 Japanese soldiers died and 108 prisoners were wounded. The Japanese War Cemetery holding the dead from the Breakout was tended after the war by members of the Cowra RSL and ceded to Japan in 1963. In 1971 the Cowra Tourism Development decided to celebrate this link to Japan and proposed a Japanese garden for the town. The Japanese government agreed to support this development as a sign of thanks for the respectful treatment of their war dead; the development also received funding from the Australian government and private entities.

The garden was designed by Ken Nakajima (1914–2000), a world-renowned designer of Japanese gardens at the time. The first stage was opened in 1979, and the second stage in 1986. The gardens were designed in the style of the Edo period and are a kaiyū-shiki or strolling garden. They are designed to show all of the landscape types of Japan. At five hectares (12 acres), the Cowra Japanese Garden is the largest Japanese garden in the Southern Hemisphere. An annual cherry blossom festival during September is now a major event in Cowra's tourism calendar.

Brazil 

With the Japanese diaspora to Brazil, many immigrants brought seedlings of cherry trees. In São Paulo State, home to the largest Japanese community outside Japan, it is common to find them in Japan-related facilities and in some homes, usually of the cultivars Prunus serrulata 'Yukiwari' and Prunus serrulata var. lannesiana 'Himalaya'. Some cities, such as Garça and Campos do Jordão, have annual festivals to celebrate the blooming of the trees and Japanese culture. In the Parana State (in southern Brazil), many cities received many of these immigrants, who planted the trees, as in Apucarana, Maringá, Cascavel and especially in the capital city of Curitiba.

In the capital city of Paraná, the first seedlings were brought by Japanese immigrants in the first half of the 20th century, but large quantities of them were only planted from the 1990s, with the opening of the Botanical Garden of Curitiba. Nowadays, the seedlings are produced locally and used in afforestation of streets and squares – as in the Japanese Square, where there are more than 30 cherry trees around the square which were sent by the Japanese Empire to Curitiba.

Canada 

Vancouver, British Columbia, is famous for its thousands of cherry trees (estimated 50,000) lining many streets and in many parks, including Queen Elizabeth Park and Stanley Park. Vancouver holds the Vancouver Cherry Blossom Festival every year. With multiple varieties and a temperate climate, they begin to bloom in February yearly and peak in April. In 2022, this intra-community arts and culture outdoor Festival will run from April 1st to 23rd, 2022. 

High Park in Toronto, Ontario, features many Somei-Yoshino cherry trees (the earliest species to bloom and much loved by the Japanese for their fluffy white flowers) that were given to Toronto by Japan in 1959. Through the Sakura Project, the Japanese Consulate donated a further 34 cherry trees to High Park in 2001, plus cherry trees to various other locations like Exhibition Place, McMaster University, York University (near Calumet College and on Ottawa Road near McLaughlin College) and the University of Toronto's main (next to Robarts Library) and Scarborough campuses. Niagara Falls has many near the falls themselves. Royal Botanical Gardens in Burlington and Hamilton was the recipient of several Somei-Yoshino cherry trees that were donated by the Consulate-General of Japan in Toronto as part of the Sakura Project. The trees are located in the Arboretum and the Rock Garden and were planted to celebrate the continual strengthening of friendship between Japan and Canada. Peak bloom time at Royal Botanical Gardens is normally around the last week of April or the first week of May.

China 

Cherry trees naturally grow in the middle northern or southern part of China, they are known as yinghua in Chinese.
	
However, some of the most famous cherry blossom parks in China reflect Japan's brief occupation of parts of China during the first half of the 20th century or the donation from Japan thereafter or prior: a notable example is Qinglong Temple - Xi’an. Cherry Blossom orchards were brought in by the Japanese monk Kukai in 806CE as a gift to commemorate his time as a student at the temple.

During the Second Sino-Japanese War, twenty-eight cherry blossom trees were planted in Wuhan University by the Japanese troops. After the war ended it was decided that the trees would be preserved despite their historical implications. In 1972, as the China-Japan relations normalized, about 800 cherry blossom trees were donated to Wuhan University. Other donations would add to the numbers in the following years. Currently, Wuhan University has about one thousand cherry blossom trees of different kinds. 80% of these cherry trees are direct descendants of cherry trees planted by the Japanese. In 2020, when cherry blossom viewing became impossible due to the spread of COVID-19, the state of cherry blossoms at Wuhan University was released on the Web and viewed a total of 750 million times.

Cherry blossoms are also used for friendship between China and Japan. In 1973, the following year of the Japan–China Joint Communiqué, Japan sent cherry trees to China as a symbol of friendship, and they were planted in the Yuyuantan Park in Beijing. After that, the cherry trees were proliferated and planted, and the park became famous for cherry blossoms.

In 1997, the Japanese Michinoku Bank and arborer Kazio Saito planned to open a cherry blossom park in Wuhan City for the sake of the friendship between the two countries, and from the same year the Japanese city of Hirosaki, home to the Hirosaki Park famous for its cherry blossoms, began to advise Wuhan City on the planting and cultivation of cherry trees, and in 2016 Wuhan City and Hirosaki City signed a friendship agreement. East Lake Cherry Blossom Park opened in 2001, and 2.5 million people came to see the blossoms in 2018. There are sixty kinds of cherry trees, including Yoshino cherry and weeping cherry.

International cherry blossoms Week in Wuxi began in the 1980s, when Keishiro Sakamoto and Kiyomi Hasegawa, Japanese citizens, planted 1,500 cherry trees in the China-Japan Friendship Cherry Blossom Forest. As of 2019, the Friendship Cherry Blossom Forest has become a cherry blossom viewing spot that attracts 500,000 cherry blossom viewers every year. As of 2019, there are 100 kinds of cherry trees in this forest.

At the beginning of the 21st century, the popularity of cherry blossoms in China rapidly increased due to an increase in the number of visitors to Japan and the spread of SNS, and many cherry blossom viewers have visited many cherry blossom parks opened throughout China. According to statistics from 2019, the number of cherry blossoms-related tourists reached 340 million and the amount spent exceeded 60 billion yuan.

Some notable cherry blossom sites in China include:
 Longwangtang Cherry Blossom Park in Lushun, Dalian, Liaoning
 East Lake Cherry Blossom Park near Wuhan University, in Donghu District, Wuhan, Hubei
 Wuhan University, in Donghu District, Wuhan, Hubei
 Nanshan Botanical Garden in Nan'an District, Chongqing
 Pingba Cherry Blossom Park in Guizhou
 Yuantouzhu in Wuxi

France 

Parc de Sceaux, located in a suburb of Paris, has two orchards of cherry trees, one for white cherry blossoms (Prunus avium) and one for pink cherry blossoms (Prunus serrulata), the latter with about 150 trees that attract many visitors when they bloom in early April.

Germany 

The cherry blossom is a major tourist attraction in Germany's Altes Land orchard region. The largest Hanami in Germany, in Hamburg, with Japanese-style fireworks, organized by the German-Japanese society, draws tens of thousands of spectators every spring. Starting in 2015, Hamburg will be allowed to bestow the title of "Cherry Blossom Queen" by the Japan Cherry Blossom Association, one of only three cities worldwide to receive this privilege. The first Cherry Blossom Queen of Hamburg will be crowned by the Cherry Blossom Queen of Japan on 23 May.

In 1990, along prior sections of the Berlin Wall, Japan donated cherry blossoms to express appreciation for German reunification. The gift was supported by donations from the Japanese people allowing for over 9,000 trees to be planted. The first trees were planted in November of that year near the Glienicke Bridge.

The Cherry Blossom festival in the Bonn Altstadt is also very famous: .

India 

In India, the cherry blossom is an attraction as well, most notably in Himalayan states like Himachal Pradesh, Uttarakhand, Jammu and Kashmir, Sikkim & northern districts of West Bengal namely Jalpaiguri and Darjeeling, along with Nagaland, northern part of Manipur and the tropical highlands of Garo Hills and Khasi Hills in Meghalaya where Prunus cerasoides is native to. These states are notable for Prunus cerasoides trees called wild cherry blossom trees covering Himalayan foothills which blooms during the autumn months. They can also be seen in various British-era botanical gardens especially in Nilgiri Hills in the Western Ghats in southern India. It blooms during the months of October and November in northern and northeastern India, while they bloom towards the end of August and into September in the southern India.

Prunus cerasoides, called wild Himalayan cherry, Indian wild cherry, and sour cherry, is known in Hindi as padam, pajja, or padmakashtha. Among Hindus in Himachal Pradesh and Uttarakhand, it is considered sacred and associated with Vishnu and Shiva. During Maha Shivaratri, the leaves are used to make a wreath with wild citrus fruits and hung at the prayer altar. In addition, the leaves are also used as incense. Unlike its cousin species in Japan and Korea, which flower in spring, Prunus cerasoides cherry trees flower during autumn.

Cherry blossom festivals in India are held during October–November when Prunus cerasoides blooms. Shillong is notable for its cherry blossom festival during autumn.

Indonesia 
In Indonesia, cherry blossoms can be found in Cibodas Botanical Garden in West Java.

Korea 

Cherry trees have been used in Korea for a long time. It has been used in making bows and woodblocks (Palman Daejanggyeong). According to tradition, monks used wood from silver magnolias, white birches, and cherry trees from the Southern coast of the peninsula. The origins of cherry blossoms in South Korea is contentious. The Japanese planted Yoshino cherry trees at Seoul's Changgyeonggung Palace and the viewing of cherry blossoms was introduced to Korea during Japanese rule. The festivals continued even after the Japanese surrendered at the end of WWII but have been controversial, and many cherry trees were cut down to celebrate the fiftieth anniversary of the Japanese surrender because they were seen as symbols of the occupation. Yet Koreans continued to plant Yoshino cherry trees and festivals began attracting a wide range of tourists. Many Korean media assert that the Yoshino cherry is the same species as a Korean indigenous, endangered species called King cherry, whose mass production is still being studied. 

In 2007, a study conducted on the comparison of King cherry and Yoshino cherry concluded that these trees were categorized as distinct species. In 2016, a study on DNA analyses suggested the independent origin between King cherry and yoshino cherry from each other. In 2016, a new scientific name Cerasus × nudiflora was given to King cherry to distinguish it from Yoshino cherry (Prunus × yedoensis). In Korea most of the places for cherry blossom festivals, including Yeouido and Jinhae, are still planted with Yoshino cherry trees.

According to the results of a survey published in 2022, most of the cherry trees planted in the National Assembly area and Yeouido, two of the capital's most famous cherry blossom viewing spots, were Japanese Yoshino cherry trees, with 90.4% of the cherry trees in the National Assembly area and 96.4% in Yeouido, and none of them were Korean King Cherry trees. Based on the results of this survey, the King cherry Project 2050, an incorporated association, plans to gradually replace Yoshino cherry trees with King cherry by around 2050.

In Korea, cherry blossoms have the meaning of purity and beauty.

Myanmar 
Cherry blossoms are part of the attraction of the temperate regions of the country. The town Pyin Oo Lwin, known as "The Land of Cherries", is famous for its cherry blossoms during the spring. Some cherry trees, genetically modified to be able to survive in the tropical weather, were also planted in Yangon, the commercial capital, as a part of the friendship program with Japan.

Netherlands 

In the year 2000, the Japan Women's Club (JWC) donated 400 cherry blossom trees to the city of Amstelveen. The trees have been planted in the cherry blossom park in the Amsterdamse Bos. A special detail is that every tree has a name — 200 trees have female Japanese names, and 200 trees have female Dutch names.

New Zealand 

Hagley Park is the largest urban open space in Christchurch, New Zealand and has many cherry blossom trees of several varieties.

Taiwan
Typically found in mountainous areas, cherry blossoms are a popular attraction in Taiwan, with numerous specially tailored viewing tours. Among the most easily accessible and thus most popular locations for viewing them are Yangmingshan, in Taipei, and Wuling Farm, in Taichung.

Thailand 
Cherry blossoms are found in Northern Thailand.

Turkey 

In 2005, Japanese cherry trees were presented by Japan to the Nezahat Gökyiğit Botanical Garden in Istanbul, Turkey. Each tree represents one sailor of the frigate Ertugrul which was a famous frigate of the Ottoman Turkish navy. On the way back from a goodwill visit to Japan in 1890 she ran into a typhoon and sank with a loss of 587 Ottoman Turkish sailors. That loss is remembered on every anniversary. The Japanese cherry trees represent the memory of those who died and provide remembrance.

United Kingdom 
From the late 19th century to the early 20th century, Collingwood Ingram collected and studied Japanese cherry blossoms and created various cultivars such as Okame and Kursar. Ingram had Taihaku, a cultivar that had disappeared in Japan in the early 20th century, return to Japan.

Cherry trees are widely cultivated in public and private gardens throughout the UK, where the climate is well suited to them. Batsford Arboretum in Gloucestershire (England), holds the national collection of Japanese village cherries, Sato-zakura Group. Keele University in Staffordshire (England), has one of the UK's largest collections of flowering cherries, with more than 150 varieties. The Royal Horticultural Society has given its prestigious Award of Garden Merit to many flowering cherry species and cultivars.

In March 2020, in the first national lockdown during the COVID-19 pandemic in England, the National Trust initiated the #BlossomWatch campaign, inspired by cherry blossom festivals in Japan. The campaign encouraged people to share images of the first signs of Spring, in particular blossom, on lockdown walks. The campaign was repeated in 2021 and 2022.

United States 

Japan gave 3,020 flowering cherry trees as a gift to the United States in 1912 to celebrate the growing friendship between the two countries, replacing an earlier gift of 2,000 trees that had to be destroyed due to disease in 1910. These trees were planted in Sakura Park in New York and lined the shore of the Tidal Basin and the roadway in East Potomac Park in Washington, D.C. The first two original trees were planted by the first lady Helen Taft and Viscountess Chinda on the bank of the Tidal Basin. The gift was renewed with another 3,800 trees in 1965. In Washington, D.C. the cherry blossom trees continue to be a popular tourist attraction (and the subject of the annual National Cherry Blossom Festival) when they reach full bloom in early spring. Just outside of Washington, the suburb of Kenwood in Bethesda, Maryland, has roughly 1,200 trees that are popular with locals and tourists.

New Jersey's Branch Brook Park, which is maintained by Essex County, is the oldest county park in the United States and is home to the largest collection of cherry blossom trees in one US location, with about 5,000.

Balboa Park in San Diego has 1,000 cherry blossom trees that blossom in mid- to late March. In Los Angeles, over 2,000 trees are located at Lake Balboa in Van Nuys. These trees were donated by a Japanese benefactor and were planted in 1992.

Philadelphia is home to over 2,000 flowering Japanese cherry trees, half of which were a gift from the Japanese government in 1926 in honor of the 150th anniversary of American independence, with the other half planted by the Japan America Society of Greater Philadelphia between 1998 and 2007. Philadelphia's cherry blossoms are located within Fairmount Park, and the annual Subaru Cherry Blossom Festival of Greater Philadelphia celebrates the blooming trees. The University of Washington in Seattle also has cherry blossoms in its quad.

Other US cities have an annual cherry blossom festival (or sakura matsuri), including the International Cherry Blossom Festival in Macon, Georgia, which features over 300,000 cherry trees. The Brooklyn Botanic Garden in New York City also has a large, well-attended festival. Portsmouth, New Hampshire, is the site of the peace conference that produced the Treaty of Portsmouth, for which the original Washington, D.C. cherry trees were given in thanks. Several cherry trees planted on the bank of the tidal pond next to Portsmouth City Hall were the gift of Portsmouth's Japanese sister city of Nichinan—the hometown of Marquis Komura Jutarō, Japan's representative at the conference. Ohio University in Athens, Ohio, has 200 somei yoshino trees, a gift from its sister institution, Japan's Chubu University.

Culinary use 

Cherry blossoms and leaves are edible and both are used as food ingredients in Japan:
 The blossoms are pickled in salt and umezu (ume vinegar), and used for coaxing out flavor in wagashi, (a traditional Japanese confectionery,) or anpan, (a Japanese sweet bun, most-commonly filled with red bean paste).
 Salt-pickled blossoms in hot water are called sakurayu, and drunk at festive events like weddings in place of green tea.
 The leaves, mostly from the Ōshima cherry because of the softness, are also pickled in salted water and used for sakuramochi.
 The fruit, called , is small and does not have much flesh beyond the seed within. Due to their bitter taste, the sakuranbo should not be eaten raw, or whole; the seed inside should be removed and the fruit itself processed as preserves.

Since the leaves contain coumarin, which is toxic in large doses, it is not recommended to eat them in great quantities. Likewise, the seeds should not be eaten.

Gallery

See also

References

External links 

 Japanese Cherry Blossom Guide
 Japanese Cherry Blossom Events & Locations
 Copenhagen Sakura Festival
 Flowering cherry Database, Forestry and Forest Products Research Institute
 Flowering cherry introduction, Forestry and Forest Products Research Institute
 International Cherry Blossom Festival Online, Information about the 300,000 Yoshino cherry trees in Macon, Georgia, and the 10-day celebration held in mid-March
 Vancouver Cherry Blossom Festival, Information about the 37,000 cherry trees in Greater Vancouver (Canada), What's in bloom now, Cherry Scout reports and maps, Cultivar identification.
 Subaru Cherry Blossom Festival of Greater Philadelphia , Information about cherry trees and the annual two-week Subaru Cherry Blossom Festival of Greater Philadelphia.
 Cherry Blossoms Celebration In Japan
 Cherry Blossoms Celebration Tourism Office Valle del Jerte in Spain

 
Cherries
Flora of Japan
Flowers
Garden plants of Asia
Ornamental trees
National symbols of Japan
Plants used in bonsai
Prunus
Spring (season)
Trees of Japan

fi:Kirsikat